Girl of the Berlin Streets (German: Das Straßenmädchen von Berlin) is a 1922 German silent drama film directed by Richard Eichberg and starring Lee Parry, Aruth Wartan and Fritz Bernhardt.

Cast
 Lee Parry as Anna Hartou 
 Aruth Wartan
 Fritz Bernhardt
 Gerhard Ritterband
 Max Wogritsch
 Olaf Storm as Baron Axel von Rhode 
 Josef Commer
 Willy Kaiser-Heyl

References

Bibliography
 Grange, William. Cultural Chronicle of the Weimar Republic. Scarecrow Press, 2008.

External links

1922 films
Films of the Weimar Republic
Films directed by Richard Eichberg
German silent feature films
German black-and-white films
1922 drama films
German drama films
Silent drama films
1920s German films